Sinadoxa corydalifolia is the only species in the monotypic plant genus Sinadoxa, in the family Adoxaceae. It is endemic to the Hengduan Mountains of the Tibetan Plateau in China.

It is a perennial herb growing from a fibrous root system with rhizomes. It produces one to four upright, green stems up to 25 centimeters tall and just a few millimeters wide. The basal leaves are pinnate, made up of leaflets which may be lobed or subdivided. There is usually one opposite pair of leaves higher on the stem, each with three leaflets. The inflorescence is a spike with interrupted clusters of 3 to 5 small, yellow-green to yellow-brown flowers. Flowering occurs in June and July.

References

Adoxaceae
Monotypic asterid genera
Endemic flora of China
Vulnerable plants
Dipsacales genera
Taxonomy articles created by Polbot